Mustafa Elkatipzade (born 1889 in Tunisia – died 4 March 1967 in İstanbul, Turkey) was a Turkish  football manager, who managed the Turkish football club Fenerbahçe. He managed the team between 1921-24 He won the 1922-23 Istanbul League Championship. He was also the manager of the General Harington Cup squad.

He founded the first youth team in Turkish football history. He also founded the Fenerbahçe S.K. Academy and managed the youngsters between 1909-11. Zeki Rıza Sporel, Hasan Kamil Sporel and Hikmet Topuzer played in the academy under his management.

He was also a member of the Committee of Union and Progress and is known for sacking all the players who refused to join the army during the Turkish War of Independence.

References

1889 births
1967 deaths
Footballers from Istanbul
Fenerbahçe football managers
Fenerbahçe S.K. board members
Committee of Union and Progress politicians
Turkish football managers